The men's 5000 metres walk event  at the 1981 European Athletics Indoor Championships was held on 22 February. It was the first time that race walking was contested at the championships.

Results

References

Racewalking at the European Athletics Indoor Championships
5000